Shebaa may refer to:

 Shebaa, Lebanon, a town
 Shebaa Farms, a disputed area of Syria claimed by Lebanon and occupied by Israel

See also
Shaba (disambiguation)